Jitka Zelenohorská (born 11 November 1946, in Prague) is a Czech actress. She performed in more than seventy films from 1961 to 1990. In the 1960s, she lived with the singer Waldemar Matuška.

Selected filmography

References

External links
 

1946 births
Living people
Czech film actresses
Czech television actresses
Actresses from Prague